In Roman law, the term bonus pater familias ("good family father") refers to a standard of care, analogous to that of the reasonable man in English law.

In Spanish law, the term used is a direct translation ("un buen padre de familia"), and used in the Spanish Código Civil. It is also used in Latin American countries. 

In Portuguese law the term is also mentioned in the Civil Code, in its direct translation ("um bom pai de família"). 

In Italian law, the term is used in a direct translation ("<diligenza del> buon padre di famiglia").

Similar is the French language expression bon père de famille, used in a sense similar to "reasonably cautious person." For example, in the case of Fales v. Canada Permanent Trust Co., [1977] 2 SCR 302, at p. 315, the Supreme Court of Canada described the standard of care and diligence expected of the manager of a trust as being "ceux qu’un bon père de famille apporte à l’administration de ses propres affaires". In the English version of the decision, this concept was translated as "that of a man of ordinary prudence in managing his own affairs."

References

Roman law
Latin legal terminology
Latin words and phrases
Family in ancient Rome